Li Baiyao (564–647), courtesy name Zhonggui (重規), formally Viscount Kang of Anping (安平康子), was a Chinese historian and an official during the Chinese Sui Dynasty and Tang dynasties. He was honored for his literary abilities, and he was known for completing the official history of Northern Qi, the Book of Northern Qi, which his father Li Delin had started.

Northern Qi people
Northern Zhou people
Sui dynasty politicians
Tang dynasty politicians
Sui dynasty historians
Tang dynasty historians
7th-century Chinese historians
564 births
647 deaths